The Hercules class ships of the line were a class of two 74-gun third rates, designed for the Royal Navy by Sir Thomas Slade.

Design

Ships

Builder: Deptford Dockyard
Ordered: 15 July 1756
Launched: 15 March 1759
Fate: Sold out of the service, 1784

Builder: Woolwich Dockyard
Ordered: 15 July 1756
Launched: 19 March 1760
Fate: Wrecked, 1780

References

Lavery, Brian (2003) The Ship of the Line - Volume 1: The development of the battlefleet 1650-1850. Conway Maritime Press. .

 
Ship of the line classes